Surgeon General William George Nicholas Manley,  (17 December 1831 – 16 November 1901) was a British Army officer, surgeon and a recipient of the Victoria Cross, the highest award for gallantry in the face of the enemy that can be awarded to British and Commonwealth forces. He received awards from several other countries, and is the only person to have been awarded both the VC and the Iron Cross.

Early life
Manley was born in Dublin, Ireland, on 17 December 1831, the second son of the Reverend William Nicholas Manley, his mother being a daughter of Dr. Brown of the Army Medical Staff. He was educated at the Blackheath Proprietary School and became a member of the Royal College of Surgeons of England in 1851.

Military career
In 1854 Manley joined the army medical staff, and was attached to the Royal Regiment of Artillery serving in Crimea. He was present for the Siege of Sevastopol during the Crimean War. He was later posted with his regiment in New Zealand.

Victoria Cross
Manley was 32 years old, and an assistant surgeon in the Royal Regiment of Artillery during the Waikato-Hauhau Maori War, New Zealand when the following deed took place on 29 April 1864 near Tauranga, New Zealand, during the assault on the rebel pā ("pah") Gate Pā, for which he was awarded the VC.

He also served in the same war under Sir Trevor Chute, and was present at the assault and capture of the Okotukou, Putahi, Otapawe, and Waikohou Pahs. For his services on these occasions he was again mentioned in dispatches and promoted to staff surgeon.

Later career
When the Franco-Prussian War broke out in 1870 he proceeded with the British Ambulance Corps, and was attached to the 22nd division of the Prussian Army. He was present for several battles, and received several decorations including the Iron Cross (second class) on the recommendation of the German Crown Prince:

In 1878–79 he served with the Quetta Field force in the Second Anglo-Afghan War, and in 1882 he was in Egypt for the Anglo-Egyptian War as Principal Medical officer of the Second Division under Sir Edward Hamley and was present at the Battle of Tel el-Kebir. After this war he was promoted to Deputy Surgeon-General.

Later life
Manley was awarded the honorary rank of surgeon general and retired from the army in 1884 with a distinguished service pension. Upon retirement he was made a Knight of the Venerable Order of Saint John of Jerusalem and a Companion of the Order of the Bath. He died in Cheltenham, Gloucestershire, on 16 November 1901.

Family
Manley married Miss M. E. Darton, daughter of Thomas Hartwood Darton, of Temple Dinsley, Hertfordshire. They had one daughter and five sons, including Lieutenant G. E. D. Manley, who died while on service in China shortly before his father's death in 1901.

Honours and awards

Manley was awarded 18 medals by several countries, and was the only recipient of both  the VC and the Iron Cross, the highest medals of the United Kingdom and Prussia (later part of the German Empire).

Among his awards were:

During his time in New Zealand he also received the bronze medal of the Royal Humane Society for rescuing a man from drowning, and after the siege of Paris he received the Cross of the Société française de secours aux blessés militaires.

His medals are on display in the medals gallery of Firepower - The Royal Artillery Museum in Woolwich, south east London.

References

Citations

General References
 
 
 The Register of the Victoria Cross (1981, 1988 and 1997)
 
 Ireland's VCs, Dept of Economic Development, 1995, 
 Monuments to Courage, David Harvey, 1999

External links
 Location of grave and VC medal (Gloucestershire)

1831 births
1901 deaths
19th-century Irish medical doctors
British Army personnel of the Anglo-Egyptian War
British Army personnel of the Crimean War
British Army recipients of the Victoria Cross
British Army regimental surgeons
British military personnel of the New Zealand Wars
British military personnel of the Second Anglo-Afghan War
Companions of the Order of the Bath
Irish officers in the British Army
Irish recipients of the Victoria Cross
Knights of Grace of the Order of St John
New Zealand Wars recipients of the Victoria Cross
People educated at Blackheath Proprietary School
Medical doctors from Dublin (city)
People of the Franco-Prussian War
Recipients of the Iron Cross (1870), 2nd class
Royal Army Medical Corps officers
Royal Artillery officers